Min-jae is a Korean unisex given name. The meaning differs based on the hanja used to write each syllable of the name. There are 27 hanja with the reading "min" and 20 hanja with the reading "jae" on the South Korean government's official list of hanja which may be used in given names. Min-jae was the ninth-most-popular name for newborn boys in South Korea in 2009.

People with this name include:

Entertainers
Kim Min-jae (actor, born 1979), South Korean actor
Kim Min-jae (actor, born 1996), South Korean actor

Sportspeople
Kim Min-jae (baseball) (born 1973), South Korean third base coach and former shortstop (Korea Baseball Organization)
Jeon Min-jae (born 1977), South Korean Paralympic athlete
Kim Min-jae (weightlifter) (born 1983), South Korean weightlifter
Kang Min-jae (born 1985), South Korean racing driver
Kim Min-jae (footballer) (born 1996), South Korean footballer

Fictional characters
Kang Min-jae, in 2004 South Korean television series My 19 Year Old Sister-in-Law

See also
List of Korean given names

References

Korean unisex given names